Liamine Mokdad (born 21 May 2000) is a French professional footballer who plays as a midfielder for French Championnat National club US Orléans.

Career
Mokdad made his professional debut with US Orléans in a 4–0 Ligue 2 loss to on 3 December 2019.

References

External links
 
 

2000 births
Living people
Association football midfielders
French footballers
French sportspeople of Algerian descent
US Orléans players
Ligue 2 players
Championnat National players
Championnat National 2 players
Championnat National 3 players